The men's 5000 metres race of the 2015–16 ISU Speed Skating World Cup 1, arranged in the Olympic Oval, in Calgary, Alberta, Canada, was held on 13 November 2015.

Sven Kramer of the Netherlands won the race, with compatriot Jorrit Bergsma in second place, and Ted-Jan Bloemen of Canada in third place. Peter Michael of New Zealand won the Division B race.

Results
The race took place on Friday, 13 November, in the afternoon session, with Division A scheduled at 14:44, and Division B scheduled at 16:51.

Division A

Note: NR = national record.

Division B

Note: NR = national record.

References

Men 5000
1